The 1982 college softball season, play of college softball in the United States began in February 1982.  Two organizations sponsored end of season tournaments crowning a national champion: the AIAW and the NCAA.  Both ended in an event called the Women's College World Series.  The season progressed through the regular season, many conference tournaments and championship series, and concluded with the dueling tournaments in May 1982.

1982 was the final season of AIAW sports, and the first of NCAA-sanctioned women's sports.

The AIAW title was claimed by  while the NCAA event crowned UCLA as champion.  Following the season, the NCAA became the sole sponsor of top-level women's college athletics, as the AIAW folded.

Conference standings

AIAW Women's College World Series

The 1982 AIAW Women's College World Series took place from May 20 to May 25, 1982 in Norman, Oklahoma.

NCAA Women's College World Series

The 1982 NCAA Women's College World Series took place from May 27 to May 30, 1982 in Omaha, Nebraska.

Season leaders
Batting
Batting average: .470 – Cindy Bogucki, Evansville Purple Aces
RBIs: 50 – Sue Lewis, Cal State Fullerton Titans
Home runs: 9 – Sue Lewis, Cal State Fullerton Titans

Pitching
Wins: 35-1 – Kathy Van Wyk, Cal State Fullerton Titans
ERA: 0.15 (3 ER/137.1 IP) – Bonni Kinne, Western Michigan Broncos
Strikeouts: 344 – Rhonda Clarke, Kansas Jayhawks

Records
NCAA Division I season consecutive wins streak:
33 – Kathy Van Wyk, Cal State Fullerton Titans; January 30-May 27, 1982

Freshman class single game hits:
6 – Ann Schroeder, Nebraska Cornhuskers; May 8, 1982

Junior class single game hits:
6 – Cindy Aerni, Nebraska Cornhuskers; May 8, 1982

Senior class winning percentage:
35-1 (97%) – Kathy Van Wyk, Cal State Fullerton Titans

References